The Bath Hotel is a pub in Broomhall district of Sheffield, in England.

The building was built in about 1868, as a grocers' shop at the end of a terrace of houses, on Victoria Street.  The grocery also operated as a beerhouse, and it was sold to Ind Coope in 1914.  Around this date, it became a dedicated pub, named after the nearby Glossop Road Baths.  In 1931, the brewery extended it into the neighbouring house and remodelled the entire pub.  It retains almost all of its fittings from this period.  It was Grade II listed in 1999, and also appears on the Campaign for Real Ale's (CAMRA) National Inventory of Historic Pub Interiors.  It was restored in 2001, the work winning the national Pub Conservation Award.

The building is three storeys high at the front, and two at the back, the two fronts meeting at a sharp corner.  The lowest part of the walls are tiled, and the original leaded windows survive, some with stained glass.  There is a toilet block at the rear, added in 1931.  Inside, there are two bars, a lounge snug in the corner with a serving hatch, and a main bar, linked by corridor, which also has access to the serving area, designed to allow stand up drinking.

Features from the 1931 remodelling include the tiled floor, counter with tiled front, fixed seating and internal doors.  Historic England describes it as "an unusually complete example of a Sheffield corner public house".

References

External links

Grade II listed buildings in Sheffield
Grade II listed pubs in South Yorkshire
National Inventory Pubs